Team Århus Floorball is a Danish floorball club playing in the Danish Floorball League for both men and women.

The club's male team has played ind the highest league since 1995 and in 2010 the team won the Danish Floorball Championship as well as the Danish Cup.

The current general manager is Jens Ørhøj and the head coach is Urban Nilsson.

Players

Current roster
Updated December 31, 2010.

|}

References

External links
Team Århus Floorball

Floorball